Pečiukai (Polish: Pieczuki) is a neighborhood of Vilnius located in the Antakalnis Eldership. It is situated northwest of the city center, on the left bank of the Neris river, south of Liepynė.

History 
A homestead was located in the present-day Pečiukai. In 1748, a ferry is supposed to have been located in the area.

References 

Neighbourhoods of Vilnius